The Rossendale Free Press is a weekly newspaper that covers the geographical Rossendale Valley and Uplands published in Chadderton, Greater Manchester, England with news coverage centred on the four main towns of Rawtenstall, Bacup, Haslingden, and Ramsbottom and surrounding villages. The paper is a weekly and comes out on a Friday although it is available in the shops on Thursday. The editorial offices in Rawtenstall closed following the consolidation of MEN Media's operations in central Manchester in May 2009; all their titles moved to Chadderton on the outskirts of Oldham in September 2010.
It is published by Trinity Mirror.

References

External links
 Rossendale Free Press

Newspapers published in Lancashire
Newspapers published by Reach plc